The Kaiser-Friedrich-Gedächtniskirche is a German Protestant church owned and used by a congregation within the Evangelical Church of Berlin-Brandenburg-Silesian Upper Lusatia. The church building is situated in Händelallee in Hansaviertel (a locality of Berlin's Mitte borough) near Großer Tiergarten. Designed by architect Ludwig Lemmer, it was built in 1957, replacing a former nineteenth-century building designed by Johannes Vollmer which was destroyed during World War II.

External links
 record 20495713 in the Marburg Picture Index
Official website

Churches completed in 1895
Churches completed in 1957
1957 establishments in Germany
KaiserFriedrichGedachtniskirche
Buildings and structures in Berlin destroyed during World War II
Frederick III, German Emperor